The Fools are a Massachusetts rock band best known for the party atmosphere of their live performances and tongue-in-cheek original songs, covers and parodies.

History
Hailing from Ipswich, Massachusetts, the band was previously named "The Rhythm A's", where future Nervous Eaters' Steve Cataldo, Robb Skeen, and Jeff Wilkinson were joined by singer Mike Girard and guitarist Rich Bartlett. By 1976, Girard and Bartlett teamed up with Stacey Pedrick (guitar), Doug Forman (bass), and Chris Pedrick (drums), becoming The Fools.

In 1979, the band released "Psycho Chicken", a parody of The Talking Heads' "Psycho Killer", and it was an immediate hit on Boston radio stations. The group followed it up with "It's a Night for Beautiful Girls," which peaked at #67 on the Billboard charts. EMI signed the band and sent them on a U.S. tour with The Knack. Shortly after, they recorded their debut album, Sold Out.

In 1981, the band released their second album Heavy Mental, which featured a cover of Roy Orbison's "Running Scared" that reached #50 on the Billboard Hot 100. That year, The Fools were the opening band for Van Halen on their Fair Warning tour. 

Shortly before being dropped by EMI, Chris Pedrick departed and was replaced by drummer Leo Black. Shortly after, Forman decided to leave, his void filled by bassist Joe Holaday.

In 1985, The Fools released World Dance Party on the independent label PVC. Four of the album's songs - "World Dance Party", "Life Sucks...Then You Die", "She Makes Me Feel Big", and a remake of Manfred Mann's "Doo Wah Diddy" - received considerable radio airplay throughout New England and the video for "Doo Wah Diddy" was shown extensively on MTV.

In 2003, after seven years of part-time duty, the band returned to a full schedule. Bassist Lou Spagnola had replaced Joe Holaday, who by then was working with the Beatles tribute band Beatlejuice. Holaday does, however, continue to make occasional appearances with the band.

In 2010, Mike Girard's book Psycho Chicken & Other Foolish Tales published by Sons of Liberty Publishers hit the stores, which outlined the sometimes hilarious history of the band.  The band continues to tour today.

In February 2012, Lou Spagnola left the band and was then replaced by Bassist Eric Adamson.

Discography

Albums
 Sold Out, EMI America, 1980
 First Annual Official Unofficial April Fools Day Live Bootleg (Live), EMI America, 1980
 Heavy Mental, EMI America, 1981
 Out Of My Head, Invasion Records, 1983
 World Dance Party, PVC, 1985
 Wake Up It's Alive (Live), PVC, 1988
 Rated XXX, Ouch Records, 1990
 World Dance Party Too (Reissue), Ouch Records, 1990
 Show 'Em You're Nuts, Ouch Records, 1991
 Christmas Toons, Ouch Records, 1992
 Wake Up It's Alive Again (Live/Reissue), Ouch Records, 1993
 Y2K (EP), Ouch Records, 1999
 Coors Light Six Pack (Live), Ouch Records, 2000
 World Dance Party 2003 (Re-reissue), Ouch Records, 2003
 The F in Beach Album (Live), Ouch Records, 2003
 10, Ouch Records, 2007
 Lost And Found, Discark (digital download), 2017

Video
 World Dance Party, Ouch Records, 2010 (filmed in 1985)

Singles

References

External links
 Official web site
 [ The Fools] at Allmusic.
 The Fools at Lost bands Of The New Wave Era.

Musical groups established in 1975
Rock music groups from Massachusetts
1975 establishments in the United States